Balvantbhai Manvar (born October 17, 1943) is an Indian politician. He was elected to the Lok Sabha, lower house of the Parliament of India from Porbandar in Gujarat as a member of the Janata Dal.

References

External links
Official biographical sketch in Parliament of India website

India MPs 1989–1991
Janata Dal
1943 births
Lok Sabha members from Gujarat
Living people